Latvijas Radio (shortened LR; literally "Latvia's Radio") is Latvia's national public-service radio broadcasting network. It began broadcasting on 1 November 1925, and has its headquarters in the Latvian capital, Riga. Latvijas Radio broadcasts six different channels in the FM band as well as via the internet: Latvijas Radio 1, Latvijas Radio 2, Latvijas Radio 3 – Klasika, Latvijas Radio 4 – Doma laukums, Latvijas Radio 5 – Pieci.lv, and Latvijas Radio 6 – Radio NABA.

History
Latvijas Radio is a national cultural institution, fostering radio drama, and organizing a radio choir as well as children's vocal groups. The organization's phonographic archives contain approximately 200,000 sound recordings. Latvijas Radio became a member of the European Broadcasting Union (EBU) on 1 January 1993. From the restoration of Latvia's independence in 1991 to 31 December 1992, it was a member of the International Radio and Television Organisation (OIRT).

Since 2013, it has collaborated with Latvijas Televīzija (Latvian Television) as part of the Public Broadcasting of Latvia news platform and online streaming service. The broadcaster has been fully funded by the state budget since 1 January 2021, when, after years of debate, it and television broadcaster Latvijas Televīzija exited the advertising market.

Latvijas Radio (as Radio Riga) also broadcast programming in Swedish from 1960 to 1995.

Radio stations

Latvijas Radio 1 (LR1) 
LR1 is Latvia's main national radio station, presenting news, talk, current affairs programmes and analysis of economics, Latvian politics and culture, as well as programmes for children. The station's first broadcast was made on 1 November 1925.

Slogan: Latvijas radio 1 – vienmēr pirmais ("Always first").

Latvijas Radio 2 (LR2)
LR2, originally conceived as a youth station, today specializes in the broadcasting of Latvian-language pop and country music.

Slogan: Dziesmas dzimtajā valodā ("Songs in our native language").

Latvijas Radio 3 – Klasika (LR3)
LR3 is the only station in Latvia broadcasting classical music and jazz. Latvijas Radio's membership of the European Broadcasting Union (EBU) means that the station's output includes relays of international concerts and other live broadcasts.

Slogan: Mode mainās – klasika paliek ("Fashions change – the classics remain").

Latvijas Radio 4 – Doma laukums (LR4)
LR4 broadcasts in minority languages, chiefly in Russian language, with programmes serving Latvia's Russian-speaking community.

Slogan: Jūsu telpa, jūsu laiks, Ваше пространство и ваше время ("Your space, your time").

Latvijas Radio 5 – Pieci.lv (LR5)

LR5 is Latvijas Radio's newest station, playing youth-oriented music from Latvia and other countries. “Pieci” in Latvian means “Five” and “Pieci.lv” could be translated as “Five.lv”

Latvijas Radio 6 – Radio NABA (LR6)
Free-format radio produced in association with the University of Latvia. At first, Radio NABA was a radio station produced by University of Latvia with help from Latvijas Radio (until March 2014. - the fifth channel on Latvijas Radio). When Pieci.lv formed in 2014, some programmes from Radio NABA continued to broadcast on Pieci.lv, but from February 2015 Radio NABA continued as a full-time radio station as Latvijas Radio sixth channel.

Station logos

See also
Eastern Bloc information dissemination

References

External links

  

Radio in Latvia
Publicly funded broadcasters
European Broadcasting Union members
Eastern Bloc mass media
Multilingual broadcasters
1925 establishments in Latvia
Radio stations established in 1925
State media